Macedonius (Greek: Μακεδόνιος; died after 360) was a Greek bishop of Constantinople from 342 up to 346, and from 351 until 360. He inspired the establishment of the Pneumatomachi (also called Macedonians), a sect later declared heretical.

Biography
After Bishop Alexander's death in 336, his orthodox followers supported Paul I of Constantinople. On the other hand, the Arians rallied round Macedonius. The former was ordained bishop, but did not hold his bishopric long. The Semi-Arian emperor Constantius II came to Constantinople, convened a synod of Arian bishops, banished Paul I, and, to the disappointment of Macedonius, translated Eusebius of Nicomedia to the vacant see. This was thought to have been in 338.

Eusebius's death in 341 restarted hostilities between the partisans of Paul and Macedonius. Paul returned, and was introduced into the Irene church of Constantinople; Arian bishops immediately ordained Macedonius in St. Paul's church. So violent did the tumult become that Constantius sent his general Hermogenes to eject Paul for a second time. His soldiers met with open resistance; the general was killed and his body dragged through the city.

Constantius at once left Antioch and punished Constantinople by depriving the people of half their daily allowance of corn. Paul was expelled; Macedonius was severely blamed for his part in these disturbances, and for allowing himself to be ordained without imperial sanction; but over all the Arians triumphed. Macedonius was permitted to officiate the church in which he had been consecrated. Paul went to Rome, and he and Athanasius of Alexandria and other orthodox bishops expelled from their sees were sent back by Pope Julius I with letters rebuking those who had deposed them. Philip the prefect executed the fresh orders of the emperor in hurrying Paul into exile to Thessalonica, and in reinstating Macedonius, but not without bloodshed.

Macedonius held the see for about six years, while letters and delegates, the pope and the emperors, synods and counter-synods, were debating and disputing the treatment of Paul and Athanasius. In 349 the alternative of war offered by Constans, emperor of the West, induced Constantius to reinstate Paul; and Macedonius had to retire to a private church. The murder of Constans in 350 placed the East under the sole control of Constantius, and Paul was at once exiled. Imperial edicts followed, which permitted the Arians to claim to be the dominant faction in the church.

Macedonius is said to have signalled his return to power by acts which, if truly reported, brand him as a cruel bigot. The Novatianists suffered perhaps even more fearfully than the orthodox and some of them were stung into a desperate resistance: those of Constantinople removing the materials of their church to a distant suburb of the city; those at Mantinium in Paphlagonia daring to face the imperial soldiers sent to expel them from their home. "The exploits of Macedonius," says Socrates Scholasticus, "on behalf of Christianity, consisted of murders, battles, incarcerations, and civil wars".

An act of presumption finally lost him the imperial favor in 358. The Sepulchre containing the body of Constantine I was in danger of falling to pieces, and Macedonius determined to remove them. The question was made a party one. The orthodox assailed as sacrilege "the disinterment of the supporter of the Nicene faith," the Macedonians pleaded the necessities of structural repair. When the remains were conveyed to the church of Acacius the Martyr, the excited populace met in the church and churchyard; so frightful a carnage ensued that the place was filled with blood and slaughtered bodies. Constantius's anger was great against Macedonius because of the slaughter, but even more because he had removed the body without consulting him.

When Macedonius presented himself at the council of Seleucia in 359, it was ruled that being under accusation it was not proper for him to remain (Socr. ii. 40). His opponents, Acacius, Eudoxius, and others, followed him to Constantinople, and, availing themselves of the emperor's indignation, deposed him in 360 on the ground of cruelty and canonical irregularities. Macedonius retired to a suburb of the city, and died there.

He is said to have elaborated the views with which his name is connected in his retirement.
The "Macedonians", his followers, did not believe in the divinity of the Holy Spirit.

His doctrine was embraced by Eleusius and others; and Macedonius brought so much zeal to the cause that its upholders were sometimes better known as Marathonians. Their grave, ascetic manners and pleasing and persuasive eloquence secured many followers in Constantinople, and also in Thrace, Bithynia, and the Hellespontine provinces. Under the emperor Julian they were strong enough to declare in synod at Zele in Pontus their separation from both Arians and orthodox. In 374 Pope Damasus I and in 381 the First Council of Constantinople condemned their views, and they gradually ceased to exist as a distinctive sect.

References

Attribution
 Fuller cites:
Socrates Scholasticus, H. E. ii. 7, 13, 16, 38, 40, etc.
Fuller advises for authorities, consult the scattered notices in Socrates, Sozomen; Hefele, Conciliengeschichte, i.; the usual Church histories and HOLY GHOST in D. C. B. (4-vol. ed. 1882).

|-

4th-century Archbishops of Constantinople
People declared heretics by the first seven ecumenical councils
4th-century Romans